Washington Turnpike may refer to:
Washington Turnpike (Connecticut)
Washington Turnpike (Maryland)
Washington Turnpike (New Jersey)
Washington Turnpike (Washington), District of Columbia, now Wisconsin Avenue